Images is an album by Phil Woods that won the Grammy Award for Best Large Jazz Ensemble Album in 1976. Woods recorded the album with an orchestra conducted by Michel Legrand, who won a Grammy for Best Instrumental Composition.

Track listing

Personnel
 Phil Woods – alto saxophone, liner notes
 Michel Legrand – piano, conductor, arranger, producer
 Armand Migiani – baritone saxophone, bass saxophone
 Derek Watkins – trumpet
 Don Lusher – trombone
 Ron Mathewson – double bass
 Judd Proctor – guitar
 Kenny Clare – drums
 Keith Grant – engineer
 Norman Schwartz – producer
 Nat Shapiro – executive producer

References

1975 albums
Phil Woods albums
Grammy Award for Best Large Jazz Ensemble Album
RCA Victor albums
Albums arranged by Michel Legrand